Coloradia is a genus of moths of the family Saturniidae. There are nine described species found in Mexico and eastern North America. The genus was first described by C. A. Blake in 1863.

These are generally large moths, predominantly grey in colour. The larvae usually feed on pines and members of the genus are commonly called pinemoths, although Coloradia pandora has been recorded on aspen.

Species
Coloradia casanovai Beutelspacher, 1993
Coloradia doris Barnes, 1900 - Doris' pinemoth
Coloradia euphrosyne Dyar, 1912
Coloradia guerreroiana Brechlin & Meister, 2010
Coloradia hoffmanni Beutelspacher, 1978
Coloradia jaliscensis Brechlin & Meister, 2010
Coloradia luski Barnes & Benjamin, 1926 - Lusk's pinemoth
Coloradia oaxacaensis Brechlin & Meister, 2010
Coloradia pandora C. A. Blake, 1863 - Pandora pinemoth
Coloradia paraguerreroiana Brechlin & Meister, 2010
Coloradia prchali Lemaire & M.J. Smith, 1992 - Prchal's pinemoth
Coloradia smithi Lemaire, 2002
Coloradia vazquezae Beutelspacher, 1978
Coloradia velda J.W. Johnson & Walter, 1981 - Velda pinemoth

References

External links

Hemileucinae